Hollywood Stargirl is a 2022 American teen romantic drama film directed by Julia Hart from a screenplay that she co-wrote with Jordan Horowitz. The film is a sequel to the 2020 film Stargirl, which was in turn based on Jerry Spinelli's 2000 novel of the same name; it is not an adaptation of the novel's sequel Love, Stargirl.

The story follows Stargirl and her mother Ana, who is hired as the costume designer on a movie, as they relocate to Los Angeles, where Stargirl meets new friends and explores her creative side, gaining success as a performer.

The film premiered on May 23, 2022, at the El Capitan Theatre in Los Angeles, California, and was released on Disney+ on June 3, 2022. It received positive reviews.

Plot
Having moved from Arizona, Stargirl and her mother Ana arrive in Los Angeles to start a new life. Ana has gotten a job as a costume designer for a feature film, but the director is notoriously difficult to work with. While strumming in her room, Stargirl meets Evan, who lives in her new apartment building. He and his brother Terrell are making a sizzle reel for a potential film and would like her to write the music and possibly act in the film. While Stargirl has never acted before, she is convinced by the brothers and visits Terrell's workplace, a bar called Forte. Stargirl recognizes one of the regular visitors, known to the brothers as "Table Six", as Roxanne Martel, a one-hit wonder who left the music scene to become a producer; she is the actual owner of Forte.

Ana's busy work schedule leaves Stargirl to her own devices. She buys a pair of headphones for her grumpy neighbor, Mr. Mitchell, who begins to open up and reveals that he was once a film producer. Stargirl also meets with Roxanne to ask if she may use her song "Miracle Mile" for the sizzle reel, but Roxanne refuses, giving the impression that she is anti-social and bitter. Stargirl and Evan decide to write their own song, "Figure It Out", and Roxanne reveals that she denied them the use of her song to encourage them to create their own. She allows them to use a professional studio to record. Stargirl and Evan begin a romance.

Stargirl, Evan and Terrell finish the sizzle reel and send it out. As they wait for a response, Stargirl relates her past to Evan. Terrell eventually learns that an executive named Priya Collins has picked up the sizzle reel. She offers them a budget of one million dollars; enough to shoot their film. At home, Ana tells Stargirl that her film's production has shut down due to the director's behavior and that she has accepted a job in Berkeley. Stargirl is angry, as she is growing to love life in Los Angeles and realizes that Ana's issues stem from her fear of settling down. Mr. Mitchell advises her that one should learn from their mistakes and tells her that he was inspired by hearing her conversation with Terrell.

Stargirl persuades Ana that they should stay and that she needs to accept the mistakes in life. At Forte, Evan and Terrell are surprised to see Stargirl with Roxanne in a new music group called Table Six and the Shirley Temples. They are happy to learn that she will be staying. Later, Terrell begins filming his new movie, Tell Your Story, with Evan and Stargirl in the leads.

Cast
 Grace VanderWaal as Susan "Stargirl" Caraway
 Elijah Richardson as Evan
 Judy Greer as Ana Caraway
 Uma Thurman as Roxanne Martel
 Judd Hirsch as Mr. Mitchell
 Tyrel Jackson Williams as Terrell
 Nija Okoro as Daphne
 Chris Williams as George
 Al Madrigal as Iggy
 Ben Geurens as Daniel
 Kristin Slaysman as Jody
 Sarayu Blue as Priya Collins
 Conor Husting as Pedro
 Sara Amini as Nicole
 Noah Taliferro as Mike
 Kelly Sry as Daryl
 Adrienne Beal as June
 Starr Gilliard as Etta Tutu
 Matt Cordova as Ken

Production
A sequel to Stargirl was announced to be in development. Julia Hart returned to direct, while Grace VanderWaal reprises her role as Stargirl Caraway. Elijah Richardson and Judy Greer joined the cast by February 2021, with Greer replacing Sara Arrington as Ana, Stargirl's mother. Michael Penn wrote music for the film, while Hart and Jordan Horowitz wrote the screenplay. By March Uma Thurman, Judd Hirsch and Tyrel Jackson Williams had joined the cast.

Principal photography began in May 2021 in Orange County, California, and wrapped in July. VanderWaal wrote and performed an original song in the film, "Figure it Out".

Release
The official trailer was released on May 2, 2022, and the film premiered on May 23, 2022, at the El Capitan Theatre in Los Angeles, California. It was released on Disney+ on June 3, 2022.

Reception

Courtney Howard of Variety stated that Hart's sequel manages to develop a new Disney franchise that stays both creative and pleasant and praised the narrative and the performances. Noel Murray of Los Angeles Times found the film even more pleasant than its predecessor and the cast members likable, while complimenting the music. Natalia Winkelman of The New York Times commented that Stargirl appears more balanced and charismatic than the previous movie. Radhika Menon of Decider found VanderWaal very charismatic as Stargirl, liked the performances of the actors and the chemistry between them, and praised the film's positive messages and role models. Kate Erbland of IndieWire gave the film a B- rating, found Stargirl to be an unconventional yet agreeable character that emphasizes self authenticity, complimented the film for its humor and sensitivity and praised the performances. Jennifer Green of Common Sense Media rated the film 3 out of 5 stars, commended the film's positive messages, citing kindness and hope, and its diverse cast, and praised the presence of role models, stating that VanderWaal's character is a respectful, open-minded and inspiring character.

References

External links
 

2022 drama films
2022 films
2020s coming-of-age drama films
2020s English-language films
2020s high school films
2020s musical drama films
American coming-of-age drama films
American musical drama films
American sequel films
Disney+ original films
Films about filmmaking
Films about interracial romance
Films based on American novels
Films based on young adult literature
Films directed by Julia Hart
Films scored by Michael Penn
Films set in Los Angeles
Films shot in California
Walt Disney Pictures films
2020s American films